Győző Martos (born 15 December 1949) is a Hungarian football player who participated in the 1978 and 1982 World Cup where Hungary was eliminated in the first round.

Club career
From 1971 to 1979, he started in his career in Ferencvárosi TC where he managed to reach the final of the European Cup Winners' Cup in the 1974/75 season where they were defeated by Dynamo Kiev (0–3).
After 1979, he moved to another Budapest side Volán FC where he played for 2 seasons before ending this playing career with Waterschei SV Thor in the Belgian First Division.

World Cup
He represented Hungary in 2 World Cup where he played in 6 matches.
In the 1978 World Cup, he played against Argentina (1–2), Italy (1–3) and France (1–3).
In the 1982 World Cup, he played against El Salvador (10–1), Argentina (1–4) and Belgium (1–1).

References
Gyözö Martos Profile
Mamrud Roberto. 2008. Hungary-Record International Players. Rec.Sport.Soccer Statistics Foundation
FIFA Official Website
Magyar Version of Wikipedia

1949 births
Living people
Footballers from Budapest
Hungarian footballers
Ferencvárosi TC footballers
Volán FC players
K. Waterschei S.V. Thor Genk players
Hungary international footballers
1978 FIFA World Cup players
1982 FIFA World Cup players
Association football defenders
Hungarian expatriate footballers
Expatriate footballers in Belgium